Anders Carlson-Wee is an American poet. His first collection, The Low Passions, was published by W. W. Norton & Company in 2019. Norton will publish his second collection, Disease of Kings, in 2023.

Personal life 
Carlson-Wee was born in Minneapolis, Minnesota to Lutheran pastor parents, and grew up in Moorhead, Minnesota. He is a former professional rollerblader, and has written extensively about hopping freight trains and traveling the country. He has dyslexia.

He has two brothers: poet and filmmaker Kai Carlson-Wee and entrepreneur Olaf Carlson-Wee.

Career 
Carlson-Wee studied at Fairhaven College of Western Washington University before earning his MFA at Vanderbilt University.

His poems have been published in various journals and magazines including The Paris Review, Harvard Review, BuzzFeed, The American Poetry Review, Ploughshares, and Virginia Quarterly Review. 

Anders is co-director of the poetry film Riding the Highline, which has won numerous prizes at film festivals.

Awards and fellowships 
 National Endowment for the Arts Fellowship
 Poetry International Prize
 McKnight Artist Fellowship
 Frost Place Chapbook Prize

Publications 
 Disease of Kings, W. W. Norton & Company, 2023
 The Low Passions, W. W. Norton & Company, 2019
 Two Headed Boy with Kai Carlson-Wee, Organic Weapon Arts, 2016
 Mercy Songs with Kai Carlson-Wee, Diode Editions, 2016
 Dynamite, Bull City Press, 2015

References

External links 

1985 births
American male poets
Poets from Minnesota
Writers from Minneapolis
Writers from Minnesota
Living people
21st-century American poets
21st-century American male writers

Year of birth missing (living people)
Writers with dyslexia